Customer Communications Management (CCM) is a software that enables companies to manage customer communications across a wide range of media. Originally, customer communications referred to printed documents, archived digital documents, email and web pages. It has grown to include SMS/MMS, in-app notifications, responsive design mobile experiences, and messages over common social media platforms. It entails an automated process that involves not only the delivery of communication, but also the segmentation of messages according to different customer profiles and contexts.

Concept 
CCM software allows organizations to deploy a new approach to information exchange, thereby improving their ability to maintain relationships with customers and other stakeholders. By using the software, messages disseminated are no longer generic but tailored according to customers' needs and specific platforms (Web, email, SMS, print) and devices (mobile, laptop, tablet, PC). For instance, if a customer interacts with an organization, the data or push messages provided cover not only the needed information but the entire context of the interaction which includes customer profile (e.g. lifestyle and life-stage needs), history of online activity, and personal preferences. This process involves the utilization of high-volume data collected offline and online.

Owing to the nature of CCMs, they are also referred to as "Intelligent Customer Communications Management" systems.

History
Before the term CCM was used, this technology was referred to as Variable Data Printing (VDP) or Variable Data Publishing. The term "Trans Promo", short for "Trans promotional", was in use as the term "VDP" gave way to "CCM" in industry-generated content.

Some Initial CCM concepts were focused upon the utilization of company transactional documents. These documents such as bank statements, statement of account, invoices and other customer transactional documents were viewed as ideal media to promote company products to customers. The rationale behind this was cited in analyst research by InfoTrends that, "transactional documents are opened and read by more than 90% of consumers. Because the average consumer is bombarded with advertising, e-mail, direct mail and other forms of solicitation each day, Trans Promo can help you cut through the clutter and stand out".

Other CCM concepts were shaped by marketing needs, and many CCM technologies improved design, testing, analytic integration, customer journey mapping capabilities to meet the needs of marketers, who became increasingly important in the technology buying process.

The scope of CCM solutions has rapidly grown beyond management and data analysis. Many contemporary solutions offer "automatic generation of sales proposals, employment contracts, loan documents, service level agreements, product descriptions and pricing, and other transactional or legal documents where re-usable content can be applied to generate accurate, consistent and personalized documents for a range of business applications". This shift into management flexibility becomes more evident as companies develop CCM solutions and products adaptable to evolving technologies available to businesses. In the recent years, this can be observed with businesses' introduction of tablets and tablet-friendly solutions into their standard scope of work.

Components
The technology that supports customer communications management also allows sophistication in the content of the messages. Customer communications management technology usually includes or integrates with the following components:

 Data Extraction, Transform & Load software
 Data Management, Analysis and Location Intelligence software
 Data Hygiene database software
 Document composition software
 Electronic document archive software and perhaps payment processing functionality
 Print Stream Engineering / Post Processing Software
 Mailing compliance database software
 Printer Management Software
 High and medium volume production printers
 Envelope inserter machines
 Email Marketing Software
 SMS Communication Software
 Mobile Media based content distribution software
 Entering the frame more recently social media distribution software
 Document Production Reporting Software
 Portal Technology
 Trans promotional Application software
 Customer Journey Mapping
 Customer Journey Orchestration

All CCM technologies feature design interfaces that primarily use a visual layout software to define the structure of the communication. These design interfaces create a basic visual structure of a communication that is later populated by a production engine with data, variably created data, static content elements, rules-driven content elements, externally referenced content and other elements to create a finished customer communication.

There are varying degrees of sophistication that CCM design interfaces handle, depending on the business needs. Some design environments are simple cloud-based interfaces that create communications for quick and easy marketing communications. There are more comprehensive interfaces that can support complex applications like insurance policy generation that require the skills and expertise of many business experts.

Most CCM technologies offer data extraction capabilities that present marketers and businesses with an opportunity to combine data from multiple systems across their business to perform customer analysis before composing communications. This allows marketers to evaluate the marketing mix and position individual products to the customer in respect of relevance to the customer or the results of purchase propensity model by applying rules on content elements within the design.

The process results in the creation of a data model, data acquisition and decision rules. These enable a document composition engine to follow its own set of document application rules, constructing individual documents on the basis of data items contained within an individual's data record. The Document Composition engine usually produces either a print stream or, XML data.

Post processing can be utilized to prepare a print job for production and distribution. This may include tasks such as the application of barcodes to deliver individual mail piece instructions to the inserters and to vary these in terms of the actual inserter being used. For example, one manufacturer's inserter may require different barcode instructions to complete the same task than another.

Print Management software controls the routing and distribution of print jobs to either a single production printer or a fleet of production printers. Print management software also provides a mechanism for assured delivery (ensuring that all pages get printed) through communication and feedback from print devices. Analysis of resultant data provides insight useful for Document Production Managers.

Relevance of communication is seen as key in overcrowded, competitive markets where service differentiation can be difficult. Documents that add value to the customer relationship are a major factor in improving customer retention and acquisition. Employing a Customer Communications Management solution can help organizations improve all these customer experiences efforts on a multi-channel communications level.

See also
 Document Automation
 Intelligent Document
 Customer Experience Management
 Enterprise output management
Customer-relationship management

References 

 
Marketing software
Marketing techniques
Document management systems